Naganandini (pronounced naga + nandini-daughter ( nandini ) of Naga/Mountain i.e. Pārvati) is a ragam (musical scale) in Carnatic music (South Indian classical music). It is the 30th Melakarta rāgam in the 72 melakarta rāgam system of Carnatic music. It is called Nagābharanam in Muthuswami Dikshitar school of Carnatic music.

Structure and Lakshana 

It is the 6th rāgam in the 5th chakra Bana. The mnemonic name is Bana-Sha. The mnemonic phrase is sa ri gu ma pa dhu nu. Its  structure (ascending and descending scale) is as follows (see swaras in Carnatic music for details on below notation and terms):
: 
: 
(the scale uses the notes chathusruthi rishabham, antara gandharam, shuddha madhyamam, shatsruthi dhaivatham, kakali nishadham)

As it is a melakarta rāgam, by definition it is a sampoorna rāgam (has all seven notes in ascending and descending scale). It is the shuddha madhyamam equivalent of Chitrambari, the 66th melakarta.

Janya rāgams 
Naganandini has a few minor janya rāgams (derived scales) associated with it. See List of janya rāgams for all rāgams associated with Naganandini.

Compositions 
A few compositions set to Naganandini are:

Nagabharanam by Muthuswami Dikshitar
Sattaleni dinamu by Thyagaraja
Dakshayani rakshamam by Dr. M. Balamuralikrishna

Related rāgams 
This section covers the theoretical and scientific aspect of this rāgam.

Naganandini's notes when shifted using Graha bhedam, yields 2 other minor melakarta rāgams, namely, Bhavapriya and Vagadheeshwari. Graha bhedam is the step taken in keeping the relative note frequencies same, while shifting the shadjam to the next note in the rāgam. For further details and an illustration refer Graha bhedam on Naganandini.

Notes

External links
 Mela Naganandini – Analysis

References

Melakarta ragas